Rydberg may refer to:

People
Gerda Rydberg (1858–1928), Swedish artist better known as Gerda Tirén
Jan Rydberg, (1923-2015), Swedish chemist who worked on nuclear chemistry and recycling at Chalmers University of Technology
Johannes Rydberg (1854–1919), Swedish physicist and deviser of the Rydberg formula
Kaisu-Mirjami Rydberg (1905–1959), Finnish journalist and politician
Per Axel Rydberg (1860–1931), Swedish-American botanist
Sam Rydberg (1885–1956), Swedish composer
Viktor Rydberg (1828–1895), Swedish author, poet, and mythographer
Viktor Crus Rydberg (1995—), Swedish ice hockey player

Physics
Rydberg constant, a constant related to atomic spectra
Rydberg formula, a formula describing wavelengths
Rydberg atom, an excited atomic state
Rydberg molecule, an electronically excited chemical substance
Rydberg unit of energy (symbol Ry), derived from the Rydberg constant

Places
 Rydberg (crater), a lunar crater named after Johannes Rydberg